Inoujście  is a former village in the administrative district of Gmina Goleniów, within Goleniów County, West Pomeranian Voivodeship, in north-western Poland. It is located within the historic region of Pomerania.

The settlement was founded as a port of the city of Stargard in the 13th century. The village was destroyed during World War II.

References

Villages in Goleniów County
Former populated places in Poland
Populated places established in the 13th century